The pink pipefish (Festucalex rufus) is a species of coastal pipefish of the family Syngnathidae. It has been found in the East Cape area of Milne Bay, Papua New Guinea, as well as the Solomon Islands, Bali, and Seram Island. They are found solitary or in pairs, always on an unidentified red tubular sponge which provides them with camouflage. They are expected to feed on small crustaceans, similar to other pipefish. This species is ovoviviparous, with males brooding eggs and giving birth to live young.

References

rufus
Marine fish
Fish described in 2015